Živadinović is a Serbian surname derived from a masculine given name Živadin. It may refer to:

Milan Živadinović (1944–2021), Serbian football manager
Milan Živadinović (footballer, born 1992), Serbian footballer
Milana Živadinović (born 1991), Serbian basketballer
Predrag Živadinović (born 1983), Serbian football player

See also
House of Dimitrije Živadinović

Serbian surnames
Slavic-language surnames
Patronymic surnames
Surnames from given names